HMS Royal Arthur was a first class cruiser of the , previously named Centaur, but renamed in 1890 prior to launching. She served on the Australia Station and briefly on the North America and West Indies Station before returning to the Home Fleet in 1906. She was paid off after the First World War.

Service history

Royal Arthur, and her sister ship , were built to a slightly modified design and are sometimes considered a separate class. She was built at Portsmouth and launched on 26 February 1891.

She first served as the flagship of the Pacific Station from 1893 to 1896, before being refitted at Portsmouth in 1897. She then served as the flagship of the Australian Station from 1897 to 1904. In that role she provided escort for the royal yacht  carrying the Duke and Duchess of Cornwall and York (the future King George V and Queen Mary) to Australia to open the new Federal Parliament in 1901. Captain Thomas Philip Walker was appointed in command in April 1901. She visited Norfolk Island in July 1902, and Suva, Fiji the following month. Captain Richard Purefoy FitzGerald Purefoy was appointed to the ship in October 1902, but did not take command until early in 1903, after Vice Admiral Arthur Dalrymple Fanshawe had taken command of the Australia Station. She left the Australia Station on 6 April 1904 and was paid off and refitted at Portsmouth.

She recommissioned in 1905 and served on the North America and West Indies Station before returning to England in 1906. Laid up in reserve for three years, she served as part of the Home Fleet and later Queenstown Training Squadron. She was a guardship at Scapa Flow during the early part of the First World War and later as a submarine depot ship.

Fate
She was paid off in 1920 and sold in August 1921 for breaking up in Germany.

References

Sources
Bastock, John (1988), Ships on the Australia Station, Child & Associates Publishing Pty Ltd; Frenchs Forest, Australia. 

 Roger Chesneau and Eugene M. Kolesnik, ed., Conway's All the World's Fighting Ships 1860–1905, (Conway Maritime Press, London, 1979),

External links

 

Edgar-class cruisers
Ships built in Portsmouth
Victorian-era cruisers of the United Kingdom
World War I cruisers of the United Kingdom
1891 ships